Bayt Umm al-Mays was a small Palestinian Arab village in the Jerusalem Subdistrict. It was depopulated during the 1948 Arab-Israeli War on October 21, 1948, by the Har'el Brigade of Operation ha-Har. It was located 14 km west of Jerusalem.

History
In 1863, Victor Guérin  found the remains of a small village, in the middle of which was a Muslim sanctuary. He further noted that the villagers had neither  wells nor cisterns, but were obliged to fetch  water from a rather distant spring.

In 1883, the PEF's Survey of Western Palestine (SWP) noted at Beit Meis:  "Ruined walls. No indication of age."

British Mandate era
In  the  1945 statistics, the village had a population of 70 Muslims with 1,013 dunums  of land. Of this, 51 dunams  were for  irrigable land or plantations, 273  for cereals,  while 2 dunams were built-up, urban,  land.

1948 and aftermath
Bayt Umm al-Mays was depopulated October 21, 1948.

Following the war, the area was incorporated into the State of Israel. According to  Morris, Ramat Raziel was established near Bayt Umm al-Mays, but according to  Khalidi  there are no Israeli settlements on village land. In 1992 it was noted that "the site is covered with wild grass that grows around the remains of stone terraces. A few almond, olive and fig trees also grow along the terraces. The remains of the demolished house, which include fragments of an archway, stand at the northern end of the village; the ruins of another house stand at a short distance from the southern end, near a  well. Two caves can be seen in the west. There are two very large stone slabs standing at the southern edge of the site, surrounded by bushes."

References

Bibliography

External links
Welcome To Bayt Umm al-Mays
Bayt Umm al-Mays,  Zochrot
Survey of Western Palestine, Map 17:    IAA, Wikimedia commons
Bayt Umm al-Mays, from the Khalil Sakakini Cultural Center
 Bayt Umm al- Mays Palestine Family.net  

  

Arab villages depopulated during the 1948 Arab–Israeli War
District of Jerusalem